Bror Jonny Danielson (born 4 September 1964) is a retired Swedish 5000m runner who has also competed at the 1988 as well as in the 1992 Summer Olympics representing Sweden.

See also 
 Sweden at the 1988 Summer Olympics
 Sweden at the 1992 Summer Olympics

References

External links 
 Sports reference

1964 births
Living people
Swedish male long-distance runners
Olympic athletes of Sweden
Athletes (track and field) at the 1988 Summer Olympics
Athletes (track and field) at the 1992 Summer Olympics